Bastián Alexis Arce Ramírez (born August 17, 1989) is a Chilean former footballer who played as a defender.

Club career
A product of Colo-Colo youth system, his professional debut came against Cobreloa on May 5, 2007.  Because Colo-Colo had an important Copa Libertadores 2007 match three days later, coach Claudio Borghi decided to rest his starting line up, which allowed Arce to make his professional debut.

International career
He has represented his country at the Sub-17 level in the 2005 South American Championship. and at the Sub-20 level in the 2009 South American Championship. He also took part in the Chile squad for the 2009 Toulon Tournament where Chile became the champion.

Honours

Club
Colo-Colo
 Primera División de Chile (3): 2007 Apertura, 2007 Clausura, 2008 Clausura

References

External links
 BDFA profile

1989 births
Living people
Chilean footballers
Chile youth international footballers
Chile under-20 international footballers
Association football defenders
Colo-Colo footballers
Rangers de Talca footballers
Santiago Morning footballers
Provincial Osorno footballers
Puerto Montt footballers
Deportes Iberia footballers
Deportes Linares footballers
Chilean Primera División players
Segunda División Profesional de Chile players
Place of birth missing (living people)